Coulston is a surname, probably an English habitation name from Coulston in Wiltshire.

Notable people with the surname include:

Ashley Coulston, Australian convicted murderer
Frank Coulston (born 1942), Scottish footballer
Fred Coulston, American toxicologist
Jean Coulston (1934-2001), New Zealand cricketer
Peter W. Coulston, an American aviation electronics technician after whom the Coulston Glacier in Antarctica is named
Walter Coulston (1912-1990), English footballer

See also 
Colston (name)